Vaganovo is a rural locality (a village) in Kichmengskoye Rural Settlement, Kichmengsko-Gorodetsky District, Vologda Oblast, Russia. The population was 41 as of 2002.

Geography 
Vaganovo is located 12 km northwest of Kichmengsky Gorodok (the district's administrative centre) by road. Kirkino is the nearest rural locality.

References 

Rural localities in Kichmengsko-Gorodetsky District